The Blood Oranges is a 1971 novel by American writer John Hawkes. The novel belongs to a triad, along with Death, Sleep, & the Traveler and Travesty. The novel takes place in a fictionalized version of Illyria.

Webster Schott, writing in Life, referred to the novel as "...poetry passing as fiction, intellectualism doubling as sex daydream."

References

1971 American novels
Novels by John Hawkes